The Glenrowan Affair is a 1951 movie about Ned Kelly from director Rupert Kathner. It was Kathner's final film and stars VFL star Bob Chitty as Kelly. It is considered one of the worst films ever made in Australia.

Plot
Artist Rupert Kathner is sketching in near Benalla. He flashes back to the story of Ned Kelly and his gang.

Cast
 Bob Chitty as Ned Kelly
 Albie Henderson as Joe Byrne
 Ben Crowe as Dan Kelly
 Bill Wright as Steve Hart
 John Fernside as Father Gibney
 Charles Tasman as Commissioner Nicholson
(However, in reality Nicholson was never Commissioner. He was only a Superintendent, whilst Standish (portrayed as Superintendent in this film) was the Commissioner during the hunt for Kelly and his gang.) 
 Charles Webb as Superintendent Hare
 Edward Smith as Superintendent Standish
 Frank Ransome as Sergeant Steele
 Stan Tolhurst as the blacksmith
 Beatrice Kay as Kate Kelly
 Wendy Roberts as Mrs Skillion
 Rupert Kathner (as "Hunt Angels") as Aaron Sherritt
 Dore Norris as Mrs Jones
 Joe Brennan as the bank manager
 Arthur Helmsley as the old man

A Message to Kelly

In August 1947 Harry Southwell arrived in Benalla, Victoria, to make a movie about the Ned Kelly story, A Message to Kelly. It was base on a script by Melbourne journalist Keith Manzie, with Rupert Kathner as assistant director. Kathner was in the area trying to raise funds for a film about Adam Lindsay Gordon.

Southwell and Kathner formed a company, Benalla Film Productions, and raised finance for the movie. Football star Bob Chitty, who was coaching in the region, was cast as Ned Kelly. Mervyn Murphy assisted with sound recording equipment. Despite vocal opposition from descendants of the Kellys, filming began in September 1947.

In October, Southwell left the project and Kathner took over. In November Benalla announced they wanted a director to replace Kathner.

The Glenrowan Affair
Kathner returned in December 1947 with finance from a new company, Australian Action Pictures, intending to make his own Ned Kelly film, based on his own script. Australian Action Pictures was formed with capital of £25,000. For a time it seemed two rival Kelly films would be made in the area. Advertisements were printed clarifying they would be made by different people.

Eventually Benalla Film Productions ceased production on their Ned Kelly movie and Kathner made his. He used Bob Chitty to play the lead but recast all the other roles, including Carlton footballer Ben Crone.

Filming began January 1948. Exteriors were shot in and around Benalla. Studio scenes were filmed in the new studio of Commonwealth Film Laboratories in Sydney in January 1950.

Reception
Reviews were poor and distribution limited. The critic for the Sun Herald stated that:
This near-unendurable stretch of laboured, amateurish film-making is something that the developing Australian film industry will wish to forget-swiftly and finally... A film made on a shoe-string (as this obviously was) could still achieve a little crude vitality. This one isn't even robust enough for the unconscious humour (and there is plenty of that) to be really enjoyable. The script is dreary, the photography more often out of-focus than in, the editing is unimaginative and the acting petrified. It would be misplaced kindness, in fact, to try and ferret out a redeeming feature.
The film was given its first screening in Victoria at Benalla. Townspeople were worried relatives of the Kellys would cause trouble. However, the screening was accompanied by audience laughter. Nonetheless the screening raised £400 for charity.

Australian film critic Michael Adams later included The Glenrowan Affair on his list of the worst ever Australian films, along with Phantom Gold, The Pirate Movie, Houseboat Horror, Welcome to Woop Woop, Les Patterson Saves the World and Pandemonium.

References

External links
 The Glenrowan Affair in the Internet Movie Database
 B for Bad B for Bogus and B for Bold: Rupert Kathner, 'The Glenrowan Affair' and Ned Kelly
 The Glenrowan Affair at Oz Movies

1951 films
1951 Western (genre) films
Australian black-and-white films
Bushranger films
Cultural depictions of Ned Kelly
Films set in colonial Australia
Films set in the 19th century
Films shot in Australia
1950s English-language films